Chaison is an unincorporated community in Delta County, in the U.S. state of Michigan.

History
The community was named for Daniel Chaison, a railroad official.

References

Unincorporated communities in Delta County, Michigan